In the context of transit in New York state, the Red Line may refer to:

 Any New York City Subway service that uses the IRT Broadway–Seventh Avenue Line and its branches:
 1 Seventh Avenue Local
 2 Seventh Avenue Express
 3 Seventh Avenue Express
 The former 9 Seventh Avenue Local
 The Jamaica route of the AirTrain JFK
 The New Haven Line of the Metro-North Railroad and its branches:
 Danbury Branch
 Waterbury Branch
 New Canaan Branch
 The Newark–World Trade Center route of the PATH Train
 The Port Washington Branch of the Long Island Rail Road